Skoganvarre is a village in Porsanger Municipality in Troms og Finnmark county, Norway.  The village is located along the Lakselva river and the European route E06 highway, about half-way between the villages of Lakselv and Karasjok.  The lake Gákkajávri lies just east of the village.  The village is an old settlement, located on old roads crossing Finnmark.  The Skoganvarre Chapel is located in the village.

References

Villages in Finnmark
Porsanger
Populated places of Arctic Norway